Kim Bok-joo (born 17 October 1960) is a South Korean former middle-distance runner who competed in the 1984 Summer Olympics. He also competed in the 800 m heats at the 1983 World Championships in Athletics and 1983 Summer Universiade.

Kim won his first major regional medal at the 1982 Asian Games, taking the 800 m silver medal behind India's Charles Borromeo (athlete). He was the 1986 Asian Games gold medallist in the 800 m and a silver medalist in the 1500 m.

See also
List of Asian Games medalists in athletics
South Korea at the Asian Games

Notes
Some English-language sources, such as GBR Athletics, erroneously state that Kim Bok-joo was winner of the 1990 men's 800 m and the 1500 m silver medallist, as well as the 1991 Asian Championships runner-up. Contemporary English and Korean sources indicate it was his similarly-named teammate Kim Bong-yu who achieved these feats.

References

1960 births
Living people
South Korean male middle-distance runners
Olympic male middle-distance runners
Olympic athletes of South Korea
Athletes (track and field) at the 1984 Summer Olympics
Asian Games medalists in athletics (track and field)
Asian Games gold medalists in athletics (track and field)
Asian Games gold medalists for South Korea
Asian Games silver medalists for South Korea
Athletes (track and field) at the 1982 Asian Games
Athletes (track and field) at the 1986 Asian Games
Medalists at the 1982 Asian Games
Medalists at the 1986 Asian Games
20th-century South Korean people